The Kavanagh Fellowship is an Irish literary award given by the  trustees of the estate of Katherine Kavanagh to an Irish poet in his or her middle years, who must be in need of financial assistance.

€20,000 is awarded annually; a sum that may be divided among multiple poets.

Winners list
2004: Desmond O'Grady
2011: Mark Granier.
2013: Gearoid Mac Lochlain, Joseph Woods and Enda Wyley
2014: Rody Gorman, Michelle O'Sullivan, Paul Perry.
2016: Nell Regan
2017: Jean O'Brien 
2018: Catherine Ann Cullen, Noel Duffy

References

Poetry awards
Irish literary awards